Yesin is a rural locality (a khutor) in Kaysatskoye Rural Settlement, Pallasovsky District, Volgograd Oblast, Russia. The population was 110 as of 2010. There are 3 streets.

Geography 
Yesin is located in steppe, on the Caspian Depression, on the right bank of the Torgun River, 49 km southwest of Pallasovka (the district's administrative centre) by road. Kaysatskoye is the nearest rural locality.

References 

Rural localities in Pallasovsky District